Fayette is a city in and the county seat of Howard County, Missouri, United States.  It is part of the Columbia, Missouri Metropolitan Statistical Area. The city's population was 2,803 at the 2020 census.

History
Fayette was laid out in 1823. The community was named after Gilbert du Motier, Marquis de Lafayette. A post office has been in operation at Fayette since 1824.

The Edwin and Nora Payne Bedford House, Central Methodist College Campus Historic District, Coleman Hall, Fayette City Park Swimming Pool, Fayette Courthouse Square Historic District, Fayette Residential Historic District, Greenwood, Prior Jackson Homeplace, Alfred W. Morrison House, Oakwood, St. Mary's Episcopal Church, South Main Street Historic District, and Dr. Uriel S. Wright Office are listed on the National Register of Historic Places.

In 1899, 19-year-old, black Fayette resident Frank Embree was accused of raping a 14-year-old white girl.  Embree claimed to be innocent; however, after a lynch mob whipped him more than 100 times, he stated that he would "own up" to the crime if the mob agreed to shoot or hang him as an alternative to continuing to torture him.  Embree was then hanged, on July 21, 1899, without ever having been tried or convicted of a crime.

Geography
Fayette is at  (39.145468, -92.686126).

Demographics

2010 census
As of the census of 2010, there were 2,688 people, 949 households, and 509 families living in the city. The racial makeup of the city was 83.5% White, 13.0% African American, 0.3% Native American, 0.5% Asian, 0.1% Pacific Islander, 0.6% from other races, and 2.1% from two or more races. Hispanic or Latino of any race were 2.2% of the population.

There were 949 households, of which 25.7% had children under the age of 18 living with them, 36.9% were married couples living together, 12.6% had a female householder with no husband present, 4.1% had a male householder with no wife present, and 46.4% were non-families. 37.0% of all households were made up of individuals, and 17.5% had someone living alone who was 65 years of age or older. The average household size was 2.17 and the average family size was 2.85.

The median age in the city was 26.1 years. 16.7% of residents were under the age of 18; 32% were between the ages of 18 and 24; 15.9% were from 25 to 44; 19.5% were from 45 to 64; and 15.8% were 65 years of age or older. The gender makeup of the city was 48.7% male and 51.3% female.

2000 census
As of the census of 2000, there were 2,793 people, 976 households, and 578 families living in the city. The population density was 1,253.6 people per square mile (483.6/km2). There were 1,133 housing units at an average density of 508.5 per square mile (196.2/km2). The racial makeup of the city was 79.16% White, 18.33% African American, 0.47% Native American, 0.21% Asian, 0.04% Pacific Islander, 0.47% from other races, and 1.32% from two or more races. Hispanic or Latino of any race were 0.93% of the population.

There were 976 households, out of which 25.0% had children under the age of 18 living with them, 41.4% were married couples living together, 14.5% had a female householder with no husband present, and 40.7% were non-families.  34.5% of all households were individuals, and 16.5% had someone living alone who was 65 years of age or older. The average household size was 2.18 and the average family size was 2.79.

In the city, the population was spread out, with 17.9% under the age of 18, 28.2% from 18 to 24, 19.5% from 25 to 44, 16.2% from 45 to 64, and 18.1% who were 65 years of age or older. The median age was 29 years. For every 100 females, there were 91.0 males. For every 100 females age 18 and over, there were 89.3 males.

The median income for a household in the city was $27,276, and the median income for a family was $35,694. Males had a median income of $27,768 versus $20,833 for females. The per capita income for the city was $13,451. About 9.1% of families and 15.6% of the population were below the poverty line, including 18.1% of those under age 18 and 20.0% of those age 65 or over.

Education
Fayette is home to Central Methodist University, a private 4-year university, which is accredited by the Higher Learning Commission. It was also home to the now-defunct Howard-Payne Junior College.

In its public school system, Fayette has one elementary school (L. J. Daly), one middle school (W. N. Clark) and one high school (Fayette).

Fayette has a lending library, the Howard County Public Library.

References

External links
 Historic maps of Fayette in the Sanborn Maps of Missouri Collection at the University of Missouri

Cities in Howard County, Missouri
County seats in Missouri
Columbia metropolitan area (Missouri)
Cities in Missouri